Ghɔmálá’, or Bamileke-Banjun (Bamiléké-Bandjoun), is a major Bamileke language of Cameroon.

It is spoken by an estimated 1.1 million people in two main population groups.

Phonology

Consonants 

 The glottal stop /ʔ/ only occurs as word-final.
 Sounds [v l ʃ ʒ ɣ] are alternative consonant sounds of /b͡v d t͡ʃ d͡ʒ ɡ/.
 /t d/, when occurring before close front-central vowel sounds /i ʉ/, can sound palatalized as [tʲ dʲ].
 Sounds /p b t d k/, when preceding a /h/ sound, are realized as affricated [p͡ɸ b͡β t͡θ d͡ð k͡x].
 /ɡ/, when occurring before central vowel sounds /ə ɐ/, may sound affricated as [ɡ͡ɣ].
 A word-final /k/ sound, may be realized as uvular sounds [q χ].

Vowels 

 Sounds /ɐ u ɔ/ when occurring with a velar nasal /ŋ/, can be realized as nasalized vowel sounds [ɐ̃ ũ ɔ̃].

Tone 
Tones are marked as high [á], low [à], central (unmarked) [a], rising [ǎ], or falling [â].

References

Languages of Cameroon
Bamileke languages